The Frankfurt Investment Arbitration Moot Court or Frankfurt Moot is a moot competition co-organised by the Max Planck Institute for European Legal History and Morgan, Lewis & Bockius LLP. It is the oldest student competition in the area of investment arbitration, with the first edition of the moot taking place in 2008. As the class-leading moot in its field (investment arbitration), it is considered one of the grand slam or major moots. With the exception of India, national rounds are not conducted, but each university may only send one team, unlike the Foreign Direct Investment Moot. Like other arbitration moots, pre-moots are also conducted by institutions such as the International Chamber of Commerce, HKIAC, and European Court of Arbitration.

Written submissions are required in the form of skeletals, but they do not count towards progression in the oral rounds, and there is also no prize for best written submissions. In recent editions, teams participate in three preliminary rounds. The top 16 teams progress to the knockout stages, and there is a prize for best oralist in the championship final. Each round is typically judged by three arbitrators. The 2020 edition of the moot was cancelled at the last moment due to COVID-19. As travel restrictions continued to remain in place, the 2021 and 2022 editions adopted the virtual format.

Competition records

References

Moot court competitions